No. 521 Squadron of the Royal Air Force was a Second World War meteorological observation unit operating from  Norfolk.

History

First formation
The Squadron began on 4 February 1941 as No. 401 (Met) Flight of RAF Bomber Command. When all the meteorological flights were put under RAF Coastal Command it became No. 1401 (Met) Flight. On 1 August 1942 at RAF Bircham Newton the flight combined with 1403 flight to form No. 521 (met) Squadron. It took part in Coastal Command's Meteorological operations
The squadron had inherited from its 1401 flight aircraft such as Gloster Gladiator biplanes and some Hawker Hurricanes. From 1403 flight came its Bristol Blenheims and Lockheed Hudsons. Later the squadron received some Supermarine Spitfires and de Havilland Mosquitos. The operations of the original Flights and later the Squadron was taking meteorological information for weather forecasting – previously provided by merchant shipping to the Met Office. The aircraft would take measurements of temperature and humidity in set areas over the North Sea from an altitude of 40,000 ft downwards. The squadrons Mosquitos would operate on "PAMPA" flights that took them deep into occupied Europe to assess the weather over target areas for the bombers. On 31 March 1943 at Bircham Newton the squadron was split into nos. 1401 and 1409 (Met) Flights.

Second formation
The squadron reformed on 1 September 1943 at RAF Docking, a satellite of the Bircham Newton station, adding to its original equipment Handley Page Hampdens, but doing without the earlier Mosquitos and Blenheims. In December 1943 the squadron received Lockheed Venturas to replace its Hudsons. Additional Hurricanes arrived in August 1944, to supplement the aging Gladiators, which were still on strength. Hudsons arrived again in September 1944, because the Venturas were needed elsewhere. In October 1944 the squadron moved a few miles to the other satellite of Bircham Newton, RAF Langham. For long-range missions the squadron received some Boeing Fortresses in December 1944, which were supplemented after the end of the war with Handley Page Halifaxes, by which time the squadron operated from RAF Chivenor, where the unit disbanded on 1 April 1946.

Aircraft operated

Squadron bases

See also
 List of RAF squadrons

References

Notes

Bibliography

External links

 Squadron history on MOD site 
 Stations used by no. 521 sqn
 Squadron histories for nos. 521–540 sqn on RafWeb's Air of Authority – A History of RAF Organisation

Aircraft squadrons of the Royal Air Force in World War II
521
Military weather units and formations
Military units and formations established in 1942
No. 521 Sq Royal Air Force